Air Marshal Sir Charles Roderick Carr,  (31 August 1891 – 15 December 1971) was a senior Royal Air Force commander from New Zealand. He held high command in the Second World War and served as Chief of the Indian Air Force.

Education and military career

Educated at a Feilding public school and Wellington College, New Zealand, Carr was commissioned as a temporary flight sub-lieutenant in the Royal Naval Air Service in July 1915. He saw action as a spotter at the Battle of Loos in October 1915 during the First World War.

In 1919, Carr went to Russia to fight on the anti-Bolshevist side in the civil war, where he won his Distinguished Flying Cross for action against the enemy. The citation was as follows:

Between 15 November 1919 and 11 February 1920, Carr served as chief of the Lithuanian Air Force (Aviacijos dalis).

In 1921, Carr was a part of Sir Ernest Shackleton's final Antarctic expedition. On his return, he was granted an RAF short service commission in the rank of flying officer.

Carr and Gillman took off from RAF Cranwell on 20 May 1927, but ran out of fuel en route, ditching in the Persian Gulf near Bandar Abbas, Iran.

During the Second World War, Carr served in Bomber Command as Air Officer Commanding No. 4 Group RAF for the majority of the war. Carr was promoted and appointed Deputy Chief of Staff (Air) at the Supreme Headquarters of the Allied Expeditionary Force in June 1945, in the final stages of the North West Europe Campaign. Two months later, Carr became Air Marshal Commanding, HQ Base Air Forces South East Asia, and then BAFSEA was disbanded, and on 1 April 1946, Air Officer Commanding-in-Chief, Air Headquarters India ("Chief of the Indian Air Force").

His war services were recognised with the award of Commander of the Legion of Honour and the Croix de Guerre by the President of France. In the 1941 New Year Honours, Carr was appointed a Commander of the Order of the British Empire, and he was promoted to Knight Commander of the same order in July 1945. He was made a Companion of the Order of the Bath in the 1943 King's Birthday Honours.

In retirement, he lived in Bampton, Oxfordshire. He died at RAF Hospital Uxbridge.

References

External links

RAF biography

|-

|-

1891 births
1971 deaths
Royal Naval Air Service aviators
Royal Air Force personnel of World War I
Royal Air Force personnel of World War II
Royal Air Force air marshals
New Zealand Knights Commander of the Order of the British Empire
New Zealand Companions of the Order of the Bath
Recipients of the Distinguished Flying Cross (United Kingdom)
New Zealand recipients of the Air Force Cross (United Kingdom)
Commandeurs of the Légion d'honneur
New Zealand recipients of the Légion d'honneur
New Zealand knights
Royal Air Force personnel of the Russian Civil War
Royal Flying Corps officers
Explorers of Antarctica
Royal Navy officers of World War I
New Zealand military personnel
People from Feilding
New Zealand aviation record holders